The Lyceum (Liceu) of Goa (1854-1961), initially called the Liceu Central de Nova Goa and, later, the Liceu Nacional Afonso de Albuquerque, was a secondary public educational institution in Goa created by decree on November 9, 1854. The decree was issued by then Governor of the State of Portuguese India Joaquim José Januário Lapa, the first Viscount of Vila Nova de Ourem.

The lyceum celebrated its 150th anniversary in 2004.

Current status

With the end of Portuguese India, the institution joined the Indian system of education, to become extinct in its earlier form.

Following the end of Portuguese rule in Goa, and with the absorption of the region into the Indian Union, "this prime educational institution suffered a quick demise". It survived for another year or two. The last batch of Finalistas (final year students) completed their studies after the Portuguese rule ended.

The institution's sprawling facilities were made available to different other institutions that were being set up—the Dhempe College of Arts and Science, a private teachers' training college, a government higher secondary school, the local institution for training children (Bal Bhavan), a law college, the Dempo College of Commerce, and the  like.  It former campus, now refurbished, has since become the home of the Goa Bench of the Bombay High Court.

References

External links
 The 1961-1962 years of the Liceu Nacional Afonso de Albuquerque, Pangim, Goa
 Liceu Nacional Afonso de Albuquerque, Goa, group on Facebook

Education in Goa
1961 disestablishments in India
1854 establishments in Portuguese India
Educational institutions established in 1854
Educational institutions disestablished in 1961